Omoglymmius sulcicollis is a species of beetle in the subfamily Rhysodidae. It was described by Lewis in 1888.

References

sulcicollis
Beetles described in 1888